Kim Jin-Il (born October 26, 1985) is a South Korean football player who, as of 2012 is playing for Yangju Citizen FC.

He was joined K-League side Pohang Steelers in 2004 season. In two season of Pohang, He played only 1 game for Korean FA Cup.

After release from Pohang, he moved Korea National League side Busan Transportation Corporation FC. He was played 21 games and 8 goals, 1 assist for 2007 season. He finished the 2008 season as Busan's top scorer and Korea National League's 2nd scorer with 18 goals.

From 2009, Kim play at newly formed Gangwon FC as founding member.

In July 2010, He move back to Korea National League side Goyang Kookmin Bank FC due to long-time injury.

Club career statistics

Honours
Busan Kyotong
Korean President's Cup (1) : 2006

References

External links
 K-League Player Record 

1985 births
Living people
South Korean footballers
Pohang Steelers players
Gangwon FC players
K League 1 players
Korea National League players
K3 League players
Association football forwards